Priyant Kumar Singh (born 16 February 1991) is an Indian professional footballer who plays as a goalkeeper for Sudeva Delhi in the I-League.

Club career
After spending years in East Bengal youth system Priyant Singh moved to the senior team with his impressive performance. Later he went to Mohamedan Sporting, and gained experience before coming back to East Bengal in the year 2012. He has represented East Bengal U-19 NFL also during his stint with junior team. He made his debut in an AFC Cup match against Al Qadsia Kuwait, in which East Bengal lost 2–3.playing for Mankundu Sporting Club (In Chandannagar football league )

References

1992 births
Living people
Association football goalkeepers
East Bengal Club players
I-League players
Indian footballers
Churchill Brothers FC Goa players
Aryan FC players
Mohammedan SC (Kolkata) players
Gokulam Kerala FC players
Calcutta Football League players